The 1955 Giro d'Italia was the 38th edition of the Giro d'Italia, one of cycling's Grand Tours. The Giro started off in Milan on 14 May with a  flat stage and concluded back in Milan with a  relatively flat mass-start stage on 5 June. Fourteen teams entered the race, which was won by Italian Fiorenzo Magni of the Nivea-Fuchs team. Second and third respectively were Italian riders Fausto Coppi and Gastone Nencini.

In the 20th stage, arriving in San Pellegrino Terme, Magni and Coppi attacked Gastone Nencini (who was leading the general classification) taking advantage of a puncture he suffered in an unpaved road section. Coppi won the stage (his last victory in the Giro) and Magni took the lead in the general classification.

Teams

Fourteen teams were invited by the race organizers to participate in the 1955 edition of the Giro d'Italia. Each team sent a squad of seven riders, which meant that the race started with a peloton of 98 cyclists. From the riders that began the race, 72 made it to the finish in Milan.

The teams entering the race were:

  
  
 Bianchi
 Doniselli
Faema
Francia
  
 
 
Legnano

Route and stages

The route was revealed on 9 March 1955.

Classification leadership

One jersey was worn during the 1955 Giro d'Italia. The leader of the general classification – calculated by adding the stage finish times of each rider – wore a pink jersey. This classification is the most important of the race, and its winner is considered as the winner of the Giro.

The mountains classification leader. The climbs all awarded three points to the first rider and one point to the second rider to cross the summit. Although no jerseys were awarded, there was also two classification for the teams, in which the teams were awarded points for their rider's performance during the stages. One classification was for the teams based inside Italy and the other was for teams based outside of Italy.

Final standings

General classification

Foreign rider classification

Mountains classification

Intermediate sprints classification

Italian team classification

Foreign team classification

References

Citations

1955
1955 in Italian sport
1955 in road cycling
May 1955 sports events in Europe
June 1955 sports events in Europe
1955 Challenge Desgrange-Colombo